Corinium Dobunnorum was the Romano-British settlement at Cirencester in the present-day English county of Gloucestershire. Its 2nd-century walls enclosed the second-largest area of a city in Roman Britain. It was the tribal capital of the Dobunni and is usually thought to have been the capital of the Diocletian-era province of First Britain (Britannia I ).

Roman fort
A Roman fort was established at Corinium in the territory of the friendly tribe of the Dobunni about a year after the Roman conquest of Britain. The main settlement in the area at the time was the hillfort at Bagendon. Three main Roman roads met in Corinium: the Fosse Way, Akeman Street, and Ermin Street.

Tribal capital

By the mid-70s CE, the military had abandoned the fort and the site became the tribal capital (civitas) of the Dobunni. Over the next twenty years, a street grid was laid out and the town was furnished with an array of large public stone buildings, two market places, and numerous shops and private houses. The forum and basilica were bigger than any other in Britain, apart from Londinium's. The basilica was decorated with beautifully carved Corinthian capitals, Italian marble wall veneers and Purbeck Marble mouldings. Unfortunately, it was built over the ditch of the old fort and the walls cracked and sank, forcing a major rebuilding project in the mid-2nd century. There appears to have been a cattle market adjoining the forum with a market hall and several butchers' shops. A system of wooden water pipes indicates there was also an aqueduct but no public baths have been identified. The amphitheatre stood to the south-east of the town in the area now called the Querns. It was built on the site of an old quarry aligned with the street grid, an unusual feature.

As yet, no temples have been located, although numerous fine sculptures show much religious activity in the town. The missing Christian bishop represented by a deacon at the Council of Arles in 314 may come from Corinium.

The town was fortified in the late 2nd century. There were five gates and polygonal towers were later added to the walls. About fifty years after their construction, there appears to have been a partial collapse and the complex was largely rebuilt to include small chambers around the circuit. These may have been animal pens, convict cells, or small shrines.

Corinium seems to have been the home to a number of very early private stone houses of wealthy individuals. Some date from the 110s. Such buildings continued to be built and occupied throughout the life of the town, but were particularly luxurious during the 4th century, when mosaic floors and fine sculpture were much in evidence. It has been suggested that the town was the centre of both a stone-carving industry, under a certain Sulinus son of Brucetus, and a mosaic industry with two schools of art, based on images of the saltire and Orpheus. There were also bakers, glass makers, blacksmiths and goldsmiths within the walls.

Provincial capital
Development continued until the 4th century. It remains unclear just where the Diocletian-era provinces of the Diocese of "the Britains" were located, but Corinium is now usually thought to have been the capital of Britannia Prima.

Decline
Around the time of the Roman withdrawal from Britain in 410, the town walls were repaired and the forum continued to be regularly cleaned. It was finally abandoned around 430. The amphitheatre was the site of a large timber building associated with 5th and 6th-century pottery. It may have been the fortified retreat of King Cyndyddan who fought at the Battle of Dyrham in 577.

Remains
The grass-covered bowl of the amphitheatre, also known as the "Bull Ring", is in the care of English Heritage.
A small section of the old Roman wall can be seen in the Abbey Park.
A large collection of artefacts from Corinium are on display in the Corinium Museum, Cirencester.

In fiction

In Robert E. Howard's story "Men of the Shadows", taking place at the time of Roman rule in Britain, a rich merchant of Corinium offers a thousand pieces of gold to anyone who would deliver to him the beautiful sister of Bran Mak Morn, King of the Picts. However, five hundred Roman soldiers who set out across Hadrian's Wall, seeking to gain the reward, are ambushed by the Picts and killed.

The Corinium Amphitheatre features in "The Antonine Romans and The Tribune's Mission" Novella by Andrew Boyce in 2020.

References 

Alan McWhirr: Roman Gloucestershire, Gloucester 1981 , 21-58
Alan McWhirr: Cirencester Excavations III, Houses in Roman Cirencester, Cirencester 1986

External links

40s establishments in the Roman Empire
History of Gloucestershire
Roman towns and cities in England
Roman sites in Gloucestershire
Cirencester